Enrico Gogokhiia (born March 26, 1991) is a professional Georgian-born Ukrainian Middleweight kickboxer. As of 26 May 2016, he is ranked the #3 lightweight in the world by LiverKick.com. In 2016 he moved to USA and switched to professional boxing.

Career
He faced Erkan Varol in the super fight of the K-1 World MAX 2012 World Championship Tournament Final in Athens, Greece on December 15, 2012. After three dominant rounds he won the fight by unanimous decision.

He defeated Bruno Gazani by unanimous decision in the first round of the 2013 Tantneft Cup on February 23, 2013.

He took a controversial decision win over Sitthichai Sitsongpeenong on the Oktagon 2013 event that was Glory 7: Milan undercard in Milan, Italy on April 20, 2013.

He replaced Mike Zambidis in the four-man tournament at the Legend 1 event in Moscow, Russia on May 25, 2013 to fight Dzhabar Askerov in the semi-finals. He lost to Askerov in what Fight Sport Asia described as "one of the nastiest 70kg knockouts in recent history"

He was scheduled to fight Chingiz Allazov at Legend 2: Invasion in Moscow, Russia on November 9, 2013 but withdrew from the match due to injury and was replaced by Warren Stevelmans.

Gogokhia defeated Alessandro Campagna via first round TKO at Legend 3: Pour Homme in Milan, Italy on April 5, 2014.

Titles
 2015 Kunlun Fight 70 kg World Championship Finalist
 2015 W5 Intercontinental Championship belt – 71 kg.
 2012 Tatneft Arena World Cup 2012 (-70 kg) champion
 2012 WKF -72,30 kg K-1 rules world champion
 Master of Sports of Ukraine Thai boxing
2009 I.F.M.A. World Muaythai Championships -63.5 kg 
2011 I.F.M.A. World Muaythai Championships -71 kg

Fight record

|-
|-  style="background:#fbb;"
| 2016-01-23 || Loss ||align=left| Sitthichai Sitsongpeenong ||  Kunlun Fight 37 - World MAX 2015, Final || Sanya, China || Ext. R Decision(1-3) || 4 || 3:00
|-  style="background:#cfc;"
|-
! style=background:white colspan=9 | 
|-
|-  style="background:#cfc;"
| 2016-01-23 || Win ||align=left| Victor Nagbe || Kunlun Fight 37 - World MAX 2015, Semi Finals|| Sanya, China, || Decision(Unanimous) || 3 || 3:00
|-  style="background:#cfc;"
| 2015-12-19 || Win ||align=left| Davit Kiria || Kunlun Fight 35 Final 8 || Luoyang, China || Decision || 3 || 3:00 
|-  style="background:#cfc;"
| 2015-10-31 || Win ||align=left| Steve Moxon || Kunlun Fight 33 Final 16 || Changde, China, || Decision || 3 || 3:00
|-  style="background:#cfc;"
| 2015-08-30 ||Win ||align=left| Foad Sadeghi || W5 Grand Prix Moscow XXX || Moscow, Russia || Decision || 3 || 3:00 
|-
! style=background:white colspan=9 | 
|-
|-  style="background:#cfc;"
| 2015-07-18 || Win ||align=left| Wang Weihao || Kunlun Fight 27 - Middleweight Tournament, Final || Nanjing, China || Decision || 3 || 3:00
|-
! style=background:white colspan=9 |
|-  style="background:#cfc;"
| 2015-07-18 || Win ||align=left| Miyakoshi Soichiro || Kunlun Fight 27 - Middleweight Tournament, Semi Finals || Nanjing, China || TKO || 3 || 
|-  style="background:#cfc;"
| 2015-04-24 || Win ||align=left| Chris Ngimbi || W5 Grand Prix - Kitek || Moscow, Russia || Decision (Unanimous) || 3 || 3:00
|-  style="background:#cfc;"
| 2014-11-29 || Win ||align=left| Jan Mazur || W5 Crossroad of Times || Bratislava, Slovakia || Decision || 3 || 3:00
|-  style="background:#cfc;"
| 2014-10-11 || Win ||align=left| Warren Stevelmans || W5 Grand Prix - Rematch || Moscow, Russia || Decision (Unanimous) || 3 || 3:00
|-  style="background:#cfc;"
| 2014-04-05 || Win ||align=left| Alessandro Campagna || Legend 3: Pour Homme || Milan, Italy || TKO (left hook) || 1 || 2:20
|-  style="background:#fbb;"
| 2013-05-25 ||Loss ||align=left| Dzhabar Askerov || Legend 1, Semi Finals || Moscow, Russia || KO (left hook) || 2 || 2:18 
|-  style="background:#cfc;"
| 2013-04-20 || Win ||align=left| Sitthichai Sitsongpeenong || Oktagon 2013 || Milan, Italy || Decision (Split) || 3 || 3:00
|-  style="background:#cfc;"
| 2013-03-30 || Win ||align=left| Hicham Boubkari || Tatneft Arena World Cup 2013 1st selection 1/4 final (-70 kg) || Nizhnekamsk, Russia || KO || 2 ||0:15
|-  style="background:#cfc;"
| 2013-02-23 || Win ||align=left| Bruno Gazani || Tatneft Arena World Cup 2013 4th selection 1/8 final (-70 kg) || Kazan, Russia || Decision (Unanimous) || 4 ||3:00
|-  style="background:#cfc;"
| 2012-12-15 ||Win ||align=left| Erkan Varol || K-1 World MAX 2012 World Championship Tournament Final, Super Fight || Athens, Greece ||Decision (Unanimous) || 3|| 3:00
|-  style="background:#cfc;"
| 2012-11-25 || Win ||align=left| Berneung Topkingboxing || Thai Boxe Mania - 2012 || Torino, Italia || Decision || 3 || 3:00
|-  style="background:#cfc;"
| 2012-10-20 || Win ||align=left| Maxim Smirnov || Tatneft Cup 2012 final || Kazan, Russia || Decision || 4 || 3:00
|-
! style=background:white colspan=9 |
|-  style="background:#cfc;"
| 2012-07-19 || Win ||align=left| Magomed Magomedov|| Tatneft Cup 2012 semi final || Kazan, Russia || Decision || 4 || 3:00
|-  style="background:#cfc;"
| 2012-06-02|| Win||align=left| Artur Alimirzoev || Tatneft Cup 2012 2nd selection 1/4 final || Kazan, Russia || KO || 1 ||  	
|-  style="background:#cfc;"
| 2012-03-24 || Win ||align=left| Bruno Franchi || Fight Code Opening Event, Dragons tournament || Milan, Italy  || KO (Body Punches) || 1 || 
|-  style="background:#cfc;"
| 2012-02-11 ||Win ||align=left| Kevin Renno || Balt Fight Pro || Tallinn, Estonia ||KO (Low kick) || 3|| 
|-
! style=background:white colspan=9 |
|-  style="background:#cfc;"
| 2012-01-21|| Win ||align=left| Valeriy Podoyakhin || Tatneft Cup 2012 2nd selection 1/8 final || Kazan, Russia || KO || 3 || 1:43 	
|-  style="background:#cfc;"
| 2011-11-12|| Win ||align=left| Philippe Salmon || Tatneft Cup 2011 final || Kazan, Russia || Decision (Unanimous) || 3 || 3:00 	
|-  style="background:#fbb;"
| 2011-10-15|| Loss ||align=left| Abderahmane Ait Said || TK2 WORLD MAX Tournament, Semi Finals || Aix-en-Provence, France || Decision || 3 || 3:00 	
|-  style="background:#cfc;"
| 2011-10-15|| Win ||align=left| Ismail Uzuner || TK2 WORLD MAX Tournament, Quarter Finals || Aix-en-Provence, France || Decision || 3 || 3:00 	
|-  style="background:#fbb;"
| 2011-07-23 || Loss ||align=left| Dzhabar Askerov|| Tatneft Cup 2011 semi final || Kazan, Russia || Decision || 4 || 3:00
|-  style="background:#cfc;"
| 2011-05-28|| Win ||align=left| Yaokgalam Chatrakanok || Tatneft Cup 2011 2nd selection 1/4 final || Kazan, Russia || Decision (Unanimous) || 3 || 3:00 	
|-  style="background:#fbb;"
| 2011-04-09|| Loss ||align=left| Mike Zambidis || W5 Grand Prix K.O, Semi Final || Moscow, Russia || Ext R. Decision (Unanimous) || 4 || 3:00 	
|-  style="background:#cfc;"
| 2011-01-20|| Win ||align=left| Sandro Berelashvili || Tatneft Cup 2011 2nd selection 1/8 final || Kazan, Russia || RTD || 1 || 1:19 	
|-  style="background:#fbb;"
| 2010-05-13|| Loss ||align=left| Urunbeck Esenkulov || Tatneft Cup 2010 2nd selection 1/4 final || Kazan, Russia || Decision (Unanimous) || 4 || 3:00 	
|-  style="background:#cfc;"
| 2010-03-28 ||Win ||align=left| Johny Tancray || K-1 World Grand Prix 2010 in Warsaw  || Warsaw, Poland ||Decision || 3 ||3:00 
|-  style="background:#fbb;"
| 2010-03-19 ||Loss ||align=left| Vitaly Gurkov || K-1 World MAX 2010 East Europe Tournament, Semi Finals  || Minsk, Belarus ||Ex. R. Decision || 4 ||3:00 
|-  style="background:#cfc;"
| 2010-03-19 ||Win ||align=left| Daulet Otarbayev || K-1 World MAX 2010 East Europe Tournament, Quarter Finals  || Minsk, Belarus ||Decision (Unanimous) || 3 ||3:00 
|-
| colspan=9 | Legend:    

|-  bgcolor="#fbb"
| 2012-09-10 || Loss||align=left| Vitaly Gurkov || 2012 IFMA World Championships, Quarter Finals|| Saint Petersburg, Russia || Decision ||  ||

|-  bgcolor="#cfc"
| 2012-09-08 || Win ||align=left| Pablo Paoliello || 2012 IFMA World Championships, First Round|| Saint Petersburg, Russia ||  ||  ||

|-  bgcolor="#fbb"
| 2011-09-25 || Loss||align=left| Vitaly Gurkov || I.F.M.A. World Championships 2011, Semi finals -71 kg || Tashkent, Uzbekistan || Decision || 4 || 2:00 
|-
! style=background:white colspan=9 |

|-  bgcolor="#cfc"
| 2011-09-24 || Win||align=left| Vahid Roshani || I.F.M.A. World Championships 2011, Semi finals -71 kg || Tashkent, Uzbekistan || WO ||  ||  
|-
| colspan=9 | Legend:

See also 
List of male kickboxers

References

External links
Profile at FightLife.ru

1991 births
Living people
Ukrainian male kickboxers
Ukrainian people of Georgian descent
Kunlun Fight kickboxers